Mbinda is a Bantu language of Angola that is closely related to Kimbundu. Ancestors of the Mpinda included speakers of Sama and Kikongo, and Mpinda has low intelligibility with neighboring languages.

References

Languages of Angola
Kimbundu languages